Anythynge You Want To is a 2001 CD release by the Firesign Theatre presenting an uncut version of their 1982 comedy LP album Shakespeare's Lost Comedie.  It takes the form of a radio play, under the conceit of being a lost work of Shakespeare, using language, plot structure, and characters which parody Shakespeare's original works.  It was originally recorded in 1980 as a program for National Public Radio's Earplay.

Track listing
 Ye Hoste (2:02)
 Ye Prologue (1:39)
 Acte I, Scene I. A Nawful Place, A Heathe (3:37)
 Acte I, Scene II. A Shippe at Sea (5:16)
 Acte I, Scene III. Ye Rampartes of Castle Pflegem (6:25)
 Ye Hoste Againne (3:13)
 Acte II, Scene I. Ye Wilde Beache (3:54)
 Acte II, Scene II. Ye Closette of ye Counte (4:33)
 Acte II, Scene III. Ye Bishopp's Celle (2:36)
 Acte II, Scene IV. A Graveyardde (6:30)
 Ye Hoste Yett Againne (2:54)
 Acte III, Scene I. Ye Coronation Roome (4:30)
 Acte III, Scene II. A Battle Fielde (2:19)
 Acte III, Scene III. Ye Bishopp's Battle Tente (6:48)
 Ye Credittes (1:33)

Release history
LP Firesign / Rhino Rnlp-807(Lp), Rnc-807-4, 1982, (as Shakespeare's Lost Comedie)
CD Firesign Theatre Records (Distributed by Whirlwind Media) 2001
CD Firesign Theatre Records / Lodestone Catatlog MSUG090 2005

Citations and references
 Firezine

2001 albums
The Firesign Theatre albums
2000s comedy albums